Patrick Henry High School (PHHS) was located at 109 South Lee Street in Stockbridge, Georgia, United States.
It was the alternative high school for the Henry County School System. It was closed after the 2015 school year after the Board of Education made the decision to move the alternative school to a different location in the county. The building is still being used today as a rental space for the filming industry and an adjacent building is used for professional development meetings. The building was the original Stockbridge High School. Patrick Henry High School relocated to the old McDonough Elementary School in McDonough and was renamed Excel Academy.

Media
PHHS was used for filming the middle and high school scenes for the Netflix series Stranger Things, McKinney High School in Candy (a Hulu mini-series), and the middle school scenes in Brightburn.

References

Educational institutions in the United States with year of establishment missing
Public high schools in Georgia (U.S. state)
Schools in Henry County, Georgia
Stockbridge, Georgia